Caribbean University is a private university system in Puerto Rico composed of four campuses.

History
It was founded on February 28, 1969, as the Caribbean Junior College in the municipality of Bayamon. In 1978, it was renamed to Caribbean University College of Bayamon and Dorado Puerto Rico. after being accredited by the Council on Higher Education of Puerto Rico. 

In 1990, after starting to offer graduate studies, it was renamed to Caribbean University. The university offers a Masters in Education.

The university is accredited by the Accreditation Board for Engineering and Technology, Inc.

In 2016, the university expanded its STEM academic programs.

Alliances
In 2015, the university formed alliances with several companies on the island and expanded its vocational training program to include degrees in Cosmetology, Nursing, Computer Programming, Business Administration and others.

In 2020, the university signed an alliance with Claro, a Puerto Rican telecommunications company in order to provide internet and other services to the community.

Campuses

 Caribbean University at Bayamón (1969)
 Caribbean University at Vega Baja (1977)
 Caribbean University at Carolina (1979)
 Caribbean University at Ponce (1985)

References

External links
 Official website—

Universities and colleges in Puerto Rico
Universities and colleges in Ponce, Puerto Rico
Bayamón, Puerto Rico
Carolina, Puerto Rico
Vega Baja, Puerto Rico
Private universities and colleges in the United States
Liga Atletica Interuniversitaria de Puerto Rico
Educational institutions established in 1969
1969 establishments in Puerto Rico